Kingsway or King's Way may refer to:

Places

Australia
Kingsway, Glen Waverley, a shopping strip in Melbourne, Victoria

Canada

Kingsway (Edmonton), a road in Edmonton, Alberta (aka Kingsway Avenue)
Kingsway (Vancouver), a road in Vancouver, British Columbia
The Kingsway, Toronto, a neighbourhood in Toronto, Ontario (aka Kingsway South)
The Kingsway, a segment of Sudbury Municipal Road 55, Sudbury, Ontario
Kingsway College, a Seventh-day Adventist boarding secondary school in Oshawa, Ontario
Kingsway Mall, a shopping centre in Edmonton, Alberta
Kingsway Village (Oshawa), a neighbourhood in Oshawa, Ontario
Burnaby—Kingsway, a federal electoral district in British Columbia between 1988 and 1997
Lambton-Kingsway Junior Middle School, a public elementary school in Etobicoke, Ontario
Vancouver Kingsway, a federal electoral district in British Columbia
Vancouver-Kingsway (provincial electoral district), a provincial electoral district in British Columbia

India
Kingsway Camp, North Delhi
Rajpath, a road in New Delhi, Delhi, (Hindi for King's Way)

New Zealand
KingsWay School, an integrated, co-ed Christian School in Red Beach, Auckland

South Africa
Kingsway High School, an English-medium, co-educational high school in Amanzimtoti, KwaZulu-Natal

United Kingdom
Kingsway (A34), a major thoroughfare from the south into Manchester and Manchester city centre, England
King's Way, a long-distance footpath in Hampshire, England
Kingsway, London, a road in London, England
Kingsway, Southport, a former nightclub and casino
Kingsway, Swansea (disambiguation), multiple uses
Kingsway Village, a village on the outskirts of Gloucester, England
Kingsway Hall, a recording venue in Holborn, England
Kingsway International Christian Centre, a church in Hackney Central, England
Kingsway Business Park Metrolink station, a Metrolink station in Milnrow, England
Kingsway Primary School, Trafford, England
Kingsway Shopping Centre, a shopping centre in Newport, Wales
Kingsway telephone exchange, underground shelter in London, England, (aka Kingsway Tunnels)
Kingsway tramway subway, a tunnel in London, England
Kingsway, part of the A725 road within East Kilbride, Scotland
Kingsway Tunnel, a road tunnel in Merseyside, England
The Kingsway, Swansea, a nightlife zone in Swansea, Wales
The Kingsway School, a secondary school in Stockport, England
Novelty Theatre (formerly Kingsway Theatre), a theatre in London, England
Westminster Kingsway College is a college merger of Westminster College and Kingsway College, in London, England

United States
Kingsway, Ohio
Kingsway Christian School, a private school in Orrville, Ohio
Kingsway East, St. Louis, a neighborhood of St. Louis, Missouri
Kingsway Elementary School, an elementary school in Port Charlotte, Florida
Kingsway Regional High School, a public secondary school in Woolwich, New Jersey
Kingsway Regional Middle School, a public middle school in Woolwich, New Jersey
Kingsway Regional School District, a school district in New Jersey
Kingsway West, St. Louis, a neighborhood of St. Louis, Missouri

Other uses
Dodge Kingsway, an automobile built by Chrysler 1935–1959
Kingsway (cigarette), a British cigarette brand
Kingsway (film), a 2018 Canadian film
Kingsway (horse) (foaled 1940), a British Thoroughbred racehorse
Kingsway (video game), a 2017 role-playing video game
Kingsway, a Christian publisher now a subsidiary of David C. Cook
"The King's Way" (song), a 1909 song written by Edward Elgar
The King's Way (novel), a 1981 novel by Françoise Chandernagor

See also
Chemin du Roy, French for the King's Way or King's Road, a historic trail in Quebec, Canada
King's Road (disambiguation)
Kingsway Underpass (disambiguation)
One King's Way, a 1995 novel by Harry Harrison and John Holm
Queensway (disambiguation)